Kupa is a village located on the right bank of the eponymous river, near Delnice, Primorje-Gorski Kotar County, Croatia; population 8 (2011).

References

Populated places in Primorje-Gorski Kotar County